"If It Wasn't for the Irish and the Jews" is a song written in 1912 by the Tin Pan Alley duo William Jerome and Jean Schwartz.  The lyrics reflect a common theme in comic songs of the era: the pairing of disparate ethnic groups, especially Irish and Jews.

References

External links
"If It Wasn't for the Irish and the Jews" sung by Billy Murray, at the Library of Congress National Jukebox
"If It Wasn't for the Irish and the Jews" 1912 sheet music, in Francis G. Spencer Collection of American Sheet Music, American Melting Pot Collection at Baylor University

1912 songs
Songs with music by Jean Schwartz
Songs with lyrics by William Jerome